Esther Arrojería Arantzazistroke (born 11 February 1994) is a Spanish female handballer for BM Bera Bera and the Spanish national team.

Arrojería made her official debut on the Spanish national team on 24 March 2018, against Poland. She also represented Spain at the 2022 European Women's Handball Championship in Slovenia, Montenegro and North Macedonia.

Honours

Club  
División de Honor Femenina de Balonmano:
Winner: 2013, 2014, 2015, 2016, 2018, 2020, 2021, 2022
Copa de la Reina de Balonmano:
Winner: 2013, 2014, 2016, 2019
Supercopa de España de Balonmano Femenino:
Winner: 2013, 2014, 2015, 2016, 2017, 2019, 2022

National team
Mediterranean Games:
Gold Medalist: 2022

References

External links

1994 births
Living people
Spanish female handball players
People from Usurbil
Mediterranean Games gold medalists for Spain
Mediterranean Games medalists in handball
Competitors at the 2022 Mediterranean Games
21st-century Spanish women